St. James Street is a major street in the city of Winnipeg, Manitoba, Canada. It is a heavily-traveled street linking Portage Avenue, Polo Park, and the St. James Industrial area.

Route description
St. James Street begins near the Assiniboine River in a small residential area south of Portage Avenue (Route 85) and runs north, parallel to Route 90. North of Portage Avenue, it enters the Polo Park and Old St. James districts, one of the city's busiest retail and commercial areas. Further north, it enters the St. James Industrial Park, which encompasses the area immediately east of the Winnipeg airport. St. James Street ends at Notre Dame Avenue.

History
St. James Street is named after the former parish of Saint James.  The parish was divided after the extension of Winnipeg city limits in 1882, when St. James Street became the city's new western boundary.  Since 1972, St. James Street has served as the boundary between the major districts of St. James-Assiniboia and the West End.  The city's former two largest sports venues, Winnipeg Arena and Winnipeg Stadium, were both located on St. James Street.

Since the 1970s and 1980s St. James Street has developed into a secondary retail shopping area of the Polo Park area. It features big box retailers such as Canadian Tire, Costco, Best Buy, Best Sleep Centre, Visions Electronics, Staples, Mark's, Old Navy, Michaels, Fabricland, and The Brick.

St. James Street has been regarded as one of the most poorly maintained streets in the city by local residents. It was voted as the "Worst Road in Manitoba" twice (2012, 2014) in annual polls conducted by the Manitoba chapter of the Canadian Automobile Association. Local government has since placed a priority on upgrading the street.

References

St._James_Street